The consignor, in a contract of carriage, is the party sending a shipment to be delivered whether by land, sea or air. Some carriers, such as national postal entities, use the term "sender" or "shipper" but in the event of a legal dispute the proper and technical term "consignor" will generally be used.

References

Freight transport
Transport law